The Joseph Smith Papers (or Joseph Smith Papers Project) is a project researching, collecting, and publishing all manuscripts and documents created by, or under the direction of, Joseph Smith (1805-1844), the founder of the Latter Day Saint movement. The documents, which include transcriptions and annotations, have appeared both online and in printed form. The Church History Department of the Church of Jesus Christ of Latter-day Saints (LDS Church) sponsors the project; the department's imprint, the Church Historian's Press, publishes the website and the printed volumes.

History of the project
After Smith's death in 1844, a collection of his papers was carried west by Brigham Young and other church leaders. Some significant documents remained with John Whitmer, Smith's widow, Emma, and others. Many of these were not published until years later by the LDS Church, the Community of Christ, and independent researchers. The "Roots of the current effort" began in the late 1960s when Truman G. Madsen invited Dean C. Jessee, then an employee of the Church Historian's Office, to contribute documents relating to Joseph Smith and early Mormonism to issues of BYU Studies. In 1972, Leonard J. Arrington was appointed the Church Historian and he directed Jessee to continue to "locate, collect, and transcribe Smith's writings."  This resulted in Jessee's 1984 publication, The Personal Writings of Joseph Smith followed by the two volume Papers of Joseph Smith, the first in 1989 and the second in 1992.

In 2001, Jessee's project became a joint venture between Brigham Young University's (BYU) Joseph Fielding Smith Institute and the LDS Church Archives. The project was renamed The Joseph Smith Papers and expanded with added funding from Larry H. and Gail Miller.  Its preliminary work was important to the creation of the landmark biography, Joseph Smith: Rough Stone Rolling, which Richard Bushman published in 2005.

In August 2004, the project received endorsement by the National Historical Publications and Records Commission, a division of the National Archives, to ensure research is conducted according to the highest scholarly standards. The project was moved back to the Church History Department in 2005.

Although not an official part of the project, a documentary TV series also called The Joseph Smith Papers was created. This series documented the creation of and work involved in the Joseph Smith Papers Project. It was produced by KJZZ-TV in cooperation with the Church History Department.

Larry H. Miller provided initial funding for a team of experts at Brigham Young University that examined documents from the early history of the LDS Church. This team later compiled The Joseph Smith Papers. Miller funded this project with a donation of $10 million in bonds and additional cash contributions.

Publishing
In February 2008, the Church Historian's Press, was established "for publishing works related to the Church's origin and growth." The publication of The Joseph Smith Papers is the press's initial project.

Marlin K. Jensen, Church Historian and Recorder at the time of the announcement, said the project will include "journals, diaries, correspondence, articles and notices. Everything of a written nature Joseph Smith generated, or over which he had oversight." High resolution images of many of the original documents were published by Brigham Young University Press in 2002 as part of Selected Collections from the Archives of The Church of Jesus Christ of Latter-day Saints. The two volume set contains 76 DVDs of images from 1830 to 1923, including complete images of the Joseph Smith Collection, circa 1831-1844, the Revelations Collections, circa 1831-1876, architectural drawings of the Nauvoo Temple, and several volumes containing minutes from meetings Joseph Smith attended or oversaw.
 
Before publication, transcripts of the manuscripts are verified three times, and annotation is supplied to illuminate the historical context of each document.."

The first volume of The Joseph Smith Papers, entitled, The Joseph Smith Papers, Journals, Volume 1: 1832–1839, was released in December 2008. Despite the $50 retail price, unexpectedly high demand caused the initial printing of 12,500 copies to sell out in two weeks, and the publishers to triple their projected second printing order to 16,500. Many Christmas purchasers bought gift certificates for the coming printing and some extant copies were resold for over twice the retail price.

Volumes
The Joseph Smith Papers project anticipates that it will publish around two dozen print volumes, as well as some additional volumes published online. The Joseph Smith Papers have been divided into the following series:

Journals
The ten journals kept by Joseph Smith and his scribes from 1832 to 1844.

 Volume 1: 1832-1839 (published November 26, 2008)
 Volume 2: December 1841-April 1843 (published November 15, 2011)
 Volume 3: May 1843-June 1844 (published November 30, 2015)

Documents
Correspondence, sermons and other addresses, official declarations and pronouncements, editorials and articles from periodicals, early versions of revelations, and "selected minutes and proceedings." Twelve volumes are projected for the print edition, of which twelve have been published. Several hundred documents from this series are available on the Joseph Smith Papers website.

 Volume 1: July 1828-June 1831 (published September 4, 2013)
 Volume 2: July 1831-January 1833 (published December 2, 2013)
 Volume 3: February 1833-March 1834 (published December 1, 2014)
 Volume 4: April 1834-September 1835 (published May 9, 2016)
 Volume 5: October 1835-January 1838 (published May 15, 2017)
 Volume 6: February 1838–August 1839 (published September 25, 2017)
 Volume 7: September 1839–January 1841 (published April 2, 2018)
Volume 8: February 1841–November 1841 (published May 13, 2019)
Volume 9: December 1841–April 1842 (published October 8, 2019)
Volume 10: May 1842–August 1842 (published May 4, 2020)
Volume 11: September 1842–February 1843 (published October 12, 2020)
Volume 12: March 1843–July 1843 (published April 26, 2021)

Histories
The histories were planned to contain Smith's complete manuscript history, which he began in 1838, and continued by clerks after his death in 1844. According to the website, "the entire multivolume manuscript history" will be published online.

 Volume 1: Joseph Smith Histories, 1832-1844 (published March 19, 2012)
 Volume 2: Assigned Historical Writings, 1831-1847 (published September 25, 2012)

Legal, business, and financial records
The series will contain legal papers in which Smith was a judge, witness, plaintiff or a defendant, and financial records including land transactions and "accounts of church-owned businesses." Only one volume is projected, which may have originally been intended for printing, but will only be available online.

Revelations and translations
This series will contain the earliest known manuscripts text of revelations received by Joseph Smith and published in his lifetime including the printer's manuscript of the Book of Mormon, the published Book of Mormon, and the Book of Commandments.

 Volume 1: Manuscript Revelation Books, Facsimile Edition (published September 22, 2009)
 Volume 1: Manuscript Revelation Books (published March 9, 2011)
 Volume 2: Published Revelations (published March 18, 2011)
 Volume 3, Part 1: Printer's Manuscript of the Book of Mormon, 1 Nephi 1 - Alma 35, Facsimile Edition (published August 4, 2015)
 Volume 3, Part 2: Printer's Manuscript of the Book of Mormon, Alma 36 - Moroni 10, Facsimile Edition (published August 4, 2015)
Volume 4: Book of Abraham and Related Manuscripts (published October 29, 2018)

Administrative records
The Administrative records series will publish records relating to the "institutions that were established under Smith's directions" as well as minutes for meetings Smith attended.

 Minute Book 1 (published online, 2011)
 Minute Book 2 (published online, 2011)
 Nauvoo Relief Society Minute Book (published online, 2011)
Administrative Records, Council of Fifty, Minutes, March 1844–January 1846 (published September 26, 2016)

Editorial board and project staff 
The current and editorial board and project staff are as follows:

Editorial Board

LeGrand R. Curtis Jr. - Church Historian and Recorder

Matthew J. Grow - Managing Director, Church History Department

National Advisory Board

Stephen J. Stein - Chancellor's Professor, Emeritus, of Religious Studies and Adjunct Professor of American History and American Studies, Indiana University, Bloomington

Harry S. Stout - Jonathan Edwards Professor of American Religious History and Chair, Department of Religious Studies, Yale University
 
Terryl L. Givens - James A. Bostwick Chair and Professor of Literature and Religion,
University of Richmond

Susan Holbrook Perdue - Program Director, Documents Compass, Virginia Foundation for the Humanities, University of Virginia

General Editors 
Ronald K. Esplin, Matthew J. Grow, Richard Lyman Bushman

Managing Historian 
Matthew C. Godfrey

Associate Managing Historian
Robin Jensen

Editorial Manager
R. Eric Smith

Assistant Editorial Managers
Nathan Waite
Riley Lorimer

Project Archivist 
Robin Scott Jensen
 
Document Specialists
Sharalyn D. Howcroft

Volume Co-editors 
Mason K. Allred, Mark Ashurst-McGee, Alexander L. Baugh, Christopher James Blythe, Gerrit Dirkmaat, David W. Grua, Karen Lynn Davidson, Steven C. Harper, William G. Hartley, Andrew H. Hedges, Christian Heimburger, Elizabeth A. Kuehn, Gordon A. Madsen, Spencer W. McBride, Max H. Parkin, Brenden W. Rensink, Brent M. Rogers, Royal Skousen, Alex D. Smith, Grant Underwood, Jeffrey N. Walker, John W. Welch, David J. Whittaker, Robert J. Woodford.

Production Editors 
R. Eric Smith, senior editor, Linda Hunter Adams, Susan Hainsworth, Rachel Osborne, Sarah Gibby Peris, Heather Seferovich, Nathan N. Waite.

Awards

In 2008, Journals, Volume 1: 1832-1839 received the Special Award in Textual Criticism and Bibliography from the Association for Mormon Letters., and the Steven F. Christensen Best Documentary Award from the Mormon History Association in 2009.

See also

Book of Mormon
Doctrine and Covenants
Golden Plates
Joseph Smith Papyri
Joseph Smith Translation of the Bible
Pearl of Great Price
Standard Works

Notes

References
.

External links
Indexes
Index to The Joseph Smith Papers, Journals, Volume 1: 1832–1839 Broken Link (error 404)
Index for Journals, Volume 2 
Miscellaneous
The Joseph Smith Papers website
The Joseph Smith Papers: Administrative Records: Minute Book 1 online edition
The Joseph Smith Papers: Administrative Records: Minute Book 2 online edition
The Joseph Smith Papers: Administrative Records: Nauvoo Relief Society Minute Book online edition
The Joseph Smith Papers: Documents: Letters, revelations, reports of discourses, minutes, etc. online collection
Marlin K. Jensen, "The Joseph Smith Papers: The Manuscript Revelation Books", Ensign, July 2009
Church History Library website
JosephSmith.net

19th-century documents
2008 non-fiction books
Book of Mormon artifacts
History books about the Latter Day Saint movement
History of the Latter Day Saint movement
Papers
LDS non-fiction
Mormon studies
Works by Joseph Smith
2008 in Christianity
21st-century Mormonism